Oenothera biennis, the common evening-primrose, is a species of flowering plant in the family Onagraceae, native to eastern and central North America, from Newfoundland west to Alberta, southeast to Florida, and southwest to Texas, and widely naturalized elsewhere in temperate and subtropical regions. Evening primrose oil is produced from the plant.

Other common names include evening star, sundrop, weedy evening primrose, German rampion, hog weed, King's cure-all and fever-plant.

Description

Blooming lasts from late spring to late summer. The flowers are hermaphrodite, produced on a tall spike and only last until the following noon. They open visibly fast every evening producing an interesting spectacle, hence the name "evening primrose".

The blooms are yellow,  diameter, with four bilobed petals. The flower structure has a bright nectar guide pattern, invisible to the naked eye. This pattern is apparent under ultraviolet light and visible to its pollinators, moths, butterflies, and bees.

The seeds of the plant are important food for birds, and it is a larval host for both the primrose moth and the white-lined sphinx moth.

Uses

Over the centuries, Indigenous people in North America have used the plant as food and traditional medicine. 

The evening primrose was introduced to Europe in the early 17th century as an ornamental plant in botanical gardens where its flowers are favored for nectar by pollinators and its seeds supply food for other birds.

Food uses
Most of the plant parts are edible, having a taste that is mild. The roots can be eaten raw or cooked like potatoes. The leaves can be eaten raw in salads or cooked like spinach or in soups. Anishinaabe tribes traditionally make tea from the evening primrose leaves for use as a dietary aid and to reduce fatigue.

The flowering stems are preferably used when they are still young in June. They have to be peeled and can then be eaten raw or fried. The flower buds are denoted as a delicacy and can be harvested from June to October.

The seeds have a protein content of about 15%, an oil content of 24%, and contain about 43% cellulose. The proteins are especially rich in the sulphur-containing amino acids, methionine and cysteine, and tryptophan. Gamma-linolenic acid (GLA), and linoleic acid are present. Mainly for these polyunsaturated fatty acids, evening primrose oil is sold as a dietary supplement.

Research

There is not enough clinical evidence to support the use of evening primrose oil as a therapy for any medical condition. A Cochrane review concluded that there was no effect of primrose oil on eczema. The Mayo Clinic stated there was no good evidence that it affected eczema, diabetic neuropathy or premenstrual syndrome.

The American Cancer Society stated that there was little evidence for its effectiveness as an anti-cancer agent, for which it is sometimes promoted, and "neither GLA nor other GLA-rich supplements (such as evening primrose oil) have been convincingly shown to be useful in preventing or treating any other health conditions."

Adverse effects
Evening primrose oil is considered likely as safe in recommended doses. It may increase the risk of bleeding, a concern for patients with bleeding disorders or taking drugs that may increase bleeding. The Mayo Clinic recommends caution in people with seizure disorders or mania, and by pregnant or breastfeeding women, and publishes a long list of possible side-effects. Oral use of evening primrose oil may cause headaches or nausea.

Traditional medicine
The whole plant and especially the leaves are traditionally boiled to tea by Anishinaabe tribes as an energy stimulant and to facilitate weight loss. These tribes also use the roots externally as a poultice to treat piles and boils. Additionally, they may be chewed and rubbed onto the muscles to improve strength.

Agricultural practices
The knowledge of agricultural practices in the cultivation of evening primrose is relatively new and only pertain to the commercialized production of evening primrose seed oil. Information of agricultural practices for the production of root vegetable or other plant parts is not known yet.

One important prerequisite is to meet adequate nitrogen requirements. While too high nitrogen levels could lead to a quality and quantity decline of the oil content in the seeds, moderate nitrogen levels lead to increased seed quality and quantity. The cultivation of evening primrose is thus suitable for no-till farming, but the plants require an intense mechanical weed control. They need approximately two to three weeks to germinate and are therefore very susceptible to the outgrowth of weeds.

Evening primrose seeds can be sown in the first half of April (spring seeds) or from mid-July to mid-August (autumn seeds). The time of harvest is approximately 75 to 80 days (spring seeds) or 100 days (autumn seeds) after flowering, and clearly influenced by the plant variety, climate conditions, soil fertility and sowing time. The population development and thus seed maturation of the evening primrose is very heterogeneous which is a rather difficult production factor.

There is not much water needed during the vegetation period. A study has shown, that the irrigation with salt water could increase the oil yield and quality in evening primrose seeds. This might be a great opportunity especially in regions with limited water resources. Thus, the evening primrose could be a valuable alternative oil crop in arid regions.

Finally, the cultivation of evening primrose requires a proper field management otherwise the plant can become invasive. If the seeds are used for pharmaceutical purposes it is also  important to grow the evening primrose without any pesticides to avoid any chemical residues.

References

External links
Profile: Yellow Evening-primrose (Oenothera biennis) Photos, Drawings, Text. (Wild Plants of Winnipeg from Nature Manitoba)

Edible plants
Night-blooming plants
biennis
Flora of North America
Medicinal plants of North America
Plants described in 1753
Taxa named by Carl Linnaeus